Floyd Historic District is a national historic district located at Floyd, Floyd County, Virginia.  It encompasses 164 contributing buildings, 1 contributing site, and 1 contributing object (Confederate Memorial, 1904) in the central business district and surrounding residential areas in the county seat of Floyd.  They include residential commercial, institutional, and governmental buildings largely built between 1832 and 1955.  Notable buildings include the Phlegar House (1816), Ferdinand A. Winston House (c. 1845), Henry Dillon House (1851), Floyd High School (1913), Horatio Howard Building (1897), Freezer Shirt Factory (1936), and Floyd County Courthouse (1951-1952). The district includes the separately listed Floyd Presbyterian Church and Glenanna.

It was listed on the National Register of Historic Places in 2005.

Gallery

References

Buildings and structures in Floyd County, Virginia
Historic districts on the National Register of Historic Places in Virginia
Greek Revival architecture in Virginia
Italianate architecture in Virginia
National Register of Historic Places in Floyd County, Virginia